Toxidia andersoni, Anderson's skipper or the southern grass-skipper, is a butterfly of the family Hesperiidae. It is found in Australia in inland New South Wales, Queensland and Victoria.

The wingspan is about 20 mm.

The larvae feed on Poa queenslandica and Tetrarrhena juncea. They construct a shelter made from rolled leaves. It rests in this shelter during the day.

External links
Australian Insects
Australian Faunal Directory

Trapezitinae
Butterflies described in 1893
Butterflies of Australia